David Hough (March 13, 1753 – April 18, 1831) was an American politician, a farmer, and a United States Representative from New Hampshire.

Early life
Born in Norwich in the Connecticut Colony, Hough attended the common schools and worked for a while as a ship carpenter.

Career
Hough moved to Lebanon, Grafton County, New Hampshire, in 1778, and served as member of the New Hampshire House of Representatives in 1788, 1789, and 1794.  He was also a Justice of the Peace and a colonel of the militia. He served as delegate to the State constitutional convention in 1783 and was a commissioner of valuation in 1798.

Elected as a Federalist to the Eighth and Ninth Congresses, Hough served as United States Representative for the state of New Hampshire from (March 4, 1803 – March 3, 1807).  Subsequently, he engaged in agricultural pursuits.

Death
Hough died in Lebanon, New Hampshire, April 18, 1831 (aged 78 years). He is interred at Cole Cemetery, Lebanon, New Hampshire.

Family life
Son of David and Desire, Hough married Abigail Huntington on July 2, 1775, and they had a daughter, Lucinda, who married Jacob Ela. They also had Philera, Nancy, Charlotte, Nabba, Lydia, David, John, John 2nd, and Lydia 2nd.

References

External links

 

1753 births
1831 deaths
American militia officers
Federalist Party members of the United States House of Representatives from New Hampshire